The Esplanade is a road between Barrack Street and William Street in the Perth central business district. It has been regularly confused with the former reserve Esplanade Reserve, that existed before the creation of Elizabeth Quay.

It follows the edge of the Elizabeth Quay area that has been developed on Perth Water, and has had notable buildings and areas adjacent to its short route.

The properties on the street include CSBP offices (now Wesfarmers House) that followed the demolition of the Esplanade Hotel, the Griffin Centre, and the Atlas Building.

The junction with Sherwood Court shares the Lawson Apartments and with Barrack Street, the Weld Club.

Intersections

References

 
Streets in Perth central business district, Western Australia